CHOA-FM is a Canadian radio station, broadcasting at 96.5 FM in Rouyn-Noranda, Quebec. The station has an adult contemporary format branded as Wow 96.5.

Owned and operated by Arsenal Media, the station aired an adult contemporary format from its inception, both under independent branding and as an affiliate of Astral Media's RockDétente and Cogeco's Rythme FM networks. The station briefly adopted a modern rock format branded as Radio X after RNC Media acquired CHOI in Quebec City in 2006, but later reverted to the Couleur FM name and format, and was rebranded as Planète in 2008. The Radio X branding later resurfaced at sister stations CHGO-FM and CJGO-FM.

CHOA also has rebroadcast transmitters in Val-d'Or (103.5) and La Sarre (103.9). RNC applied in 1996 to convert CHOA's retransmitter in Val-d'Or into an originating station, but was denied because the market could not support a new commercial station.

In December 2014, it was announced that CHOA-FM would become an affiliate of Cogeco's Rythme FM network, starting on March 9, 2015. The station was the second Rythme FM outlet owned by RNC, with CHLX-FM Gatineau being the first.

On August 7. 2017, CHOA dropped the "Rhythme" brand and re-branded as Wow FM. CHLX had similarly re-branded.

References

External links
Wow 96.5
 

Streema Wow FM 96.5 - CHOA-FM - FM 96.5 - Rouyn-Noranda, QC - Listen Online

Hoa
Hoa
Hoa
Radio stations established in 1990
1990 establishments in Quebec